Kevin Clarke (born 14 February 1967) is an Irish-German music historian specializing in 1920s jazz operettas.

Born in Berlin, Germany, Clarke is the author of various books dealing with topics such as the jazz and revue operettas of the Weimar Republic, operetta in Nazi Germany, and homosexuality and operetta. Since 2006 he has been director of the Operetta Research Center Amsterdam (ORCA).

Writings
 The Art of Looking: The Life and Treasures of Collector Charles Leslie (Bruno Gmuender, 2015).
 Die Welt der Operette. Glamour, Stars & Showbusiness (Wien: Brandstätter, 2011), .
 "Im Himmel spielt auch schon die Jazzband". Emmerich Kálmán und die transatlantische Operette 1928–32 (Hamburg: von Bockel, 2007, .
 Glitter and be Gay: Die authentische Operette und ihre schwulen Verehrer (Hamburg: Männerschwarm, 2007), .
 Im Weißen Rössl – Auf den Spuren eines Welterfolg (St. Wolfgang: Rössl Hotel, 2007), .
 Die Tagebücher des Dr. Ralph Benatzky. Zwischen Berlin und Hollywood: Eine Zeitreise in die 20er Jahre, audio book )Duo-phon Records), .
 Holland in musicals en operettes, in: Actuele Onderwerpen, No. 2814 (2004).

External links
Official site of the Operetta Research Center Amsterdam (ORCA) (in English)
"Aspekte der Aufführungspraxis oder: Wie klingt eine historisch informierte Spielweise der Operette?" Article in German on the performance tradition of operetta, 2006, online magazine of the Frankfurter Zeitschrift für Musikwissenschaft
Ralph Benatzky official site

1967 births
Musicologists from Berlin
Living people
Music historians
Musicians from Berlin